A. Debbarma was an Indian politician and a leader of the Communist Party of India. He was a member of the Tripura Legislative Assembly, representing the Charilam constituency from 1967 to 1972.

References

Communist Party of India politicians from Tripura
People from Tripura
Year of birth missing
Possibly living people
Tripura MLAs 1967–1972